The Church of St. John the Baptist is one of the oldest Orthodox churches in Nizhny Novgorod, mentioned from the 15th century. The stone church was consecrated in 1683, again on November 4, 2005. The nearest Ivanovskaya tower of the Kremlin was named after this temple. The church is located on the National Unity Square, Rozhdestvenskaya Street.

In the Time of Troubles (in 1612), Kuzma Minin appealed to the citizens of Nizhny Novgorod to liberate Moscow from the Polish intervention from the church porch. At that time, the church was still wooden.

History 

The wooden church of the Nativity of John the Baptist in Lower Posad is known from the 15th century. At the beginning of the 17th century, the church had a refectory and parvise.

In 1676, the merchant Gavriil (Gabriel) Stepanovich Dranishnikov, who returned from Astrakhan after many years of service, asked Metropolitan Philaret for the construction of a stone temple from his own treasury. The construction of the temple was to confirm Dranishnikov’s commitment to Orthodoxy, since his wife Anna and son became Old Believers and fled to the Kerzhensky monasteries. On August 24, 1679, Gavriil Dranishnikov died, but the temple was completed by his brother Lavrentiy (Lawrence), as Dranishnikov bequeathed, with a southern chapel in honor of the martyress Anna, in memory of his wife, who had gone into schism.

The “ship-type” temple was set up on a high brick sub-chapel, which housed shops, which were pritch over to merchants for rent. In 1814, a spiritual aisle was attached to the north side of the refectory.

During the town-planning transformations of 1834-1839, it was indicated to clear the land adjacent to the Kremlin from all kinds of buildings, and remove the altar of the Church of St. John the Baptist and all the shops, which disrupted the ancient drainage system, and the underground springs began to gradually erode the foundation.

In 1855 a chapel of Alexander Nevsky and a gatehouse were attached to the church. In 1870, the bell tower was rebuilt. In 1881 - 1885, major restoration work was again required. In 1899, after breaking the iron connection inside the temple, the altar was rebuilt.

In 1937 the church was closed, and its last abbot was shot. In the Soviet period, the DOSAAF motorcycle school was located in the church building.

Church restoration 
The temple was returned to the Nizhny Novgorod diocese in the 1990s of the 20th century, and services were resumed since 1994. In June 2004, the decision was made to restore the temple, repair work began. Funds for the restoration were received from the patrons, out of 67 million rubles 60 million were invested by the Balakhna pulp and paper mill. On April 4, 2005, 3 more crosses for installation on the dome were consecrated (2 have already been installed). On August 5, 2005, a dome and a cross were installed on the bell tower. On November 4, 2005, the church was consecrated by Patriarch of Moscow and All Rus' Alexy II. During the restoration of the church, the Christian worship in it did not stop.

During the restoration work, a retaining concrete wall was built, and the zero marks were returned to the level of the 19th century.

In 2009, an Orthodox Rood screen hall began to operate in the church.

Gallery

Shrines 

 Kazan Icon of the Mother of God, presented by Patriarch of Moscow and All Rus' Alexy II.
 Icon of St. John the Baptist with a particle of relics.

References

Links 

 The official website of the Church of the Nativity of John the Baptist
Churches in Nizhny Novgorod
Pages with unreviewed translations
Cultural heritage monuments of regional significance in Nizhny Novgorod Oblast
Russian Orthodox church buildings in Russia